James Weams (1851 – 1911) was a Durham born comedian, and concert hall singer/songwriter and performer at the end of the 19th century and start of the 20th century. His most famous song is "Neighbors Belaw" (or now often called "The neighbours doon belaa").

Early life 
James Weams (correct surname Wemyss) was born in the City of Durham in 1851. He was a well-educated man and a first class all-round entertainer; a musician, comedian, singer and songwriter.

He worked as an entertainer on the (mainly local to the North East of England) music hall circuit and wrote songs and lyrics. He was an accomplished musician and, on several occasions, played 2nd violin in an orchestra too.

Weams contributed two especially great songs to the local repertoire. 
The first was "Neighbors Belaw" (now more often called "The neighbours doon belaa"), which was a humorous look at problems of life in a flat and was a favourite of Harry Nelson, one of Tyneside’s great music hall comedians of the day.
The second was "The lass on the quay" (nicknamed “Sally Gee”, which was an irreverent look at love and the way “it is blind”

He retired eventually to Deptford, at that time an inner suburb of Sunderland, situated on the River Wear where he took on a public house. The Rowers Arms, Colin Place, Deptford, Sunderland, which has long since been demolished, as has the street.

Works 
These include :-
 Ejected - a tale of eviction
 Neighbors Belaw (or nbow often called "The neighbours doon belaa") - the troubles of living in a flat
 Lass on the Quay - a tale of love and Sally Gee
 Football Club (The) - one of only a few songs about football
 Gateshead Mash (The) - a song about a fancy dresser from Gateshead
 James Weams' Tyneside Song Book 1887 - an 8 page song book of some of his works

Recordings
 Tim Healey on CD entitled "From Tyne to Tweed - Various Artists" includes "The Neighbours Doon Belaa" together with 19 other titles MWM Records  ref (MWMCDSP52)

See also 
Geordie dialect words
James Weams' Tyneside Song Book 1887

References

External links
 FARNE - Folk Archive Resource North East
 Wor Geordie Dialect - the songwriters

English singers
English songwriters
English male comedians
People from the City of Sunderland
Musicians from Tyne and Wear
People from Durham, England
1911 deaths
1851 births
Geordie songwriters
19th-century English singers